211 AD is a year of the Common Era.

211 may also refer to:

 211 (number)
 211 BC, a year Before the Common Era

Places
 211 Isolda, a Main-Belt asteroid, the 211st asteroid registered
 Route 211, see List of highways numbered 211

Telecommunications
 2-1-1, an N-1-1 telephone number in North America
 +211, the telephone country code for South Sudan

Transportation
 211 series, a Japanese electric multiple unit train class
 US-Bangla Airlines Flight 211, a 2018 plane crash

Other uses
 211 (film), a 2018 U.S. crime-drama film
 Project 211, a Chinese project to develop comprehensive universities and colleges
 Raufoss Mk 211, a .50-calibre ammunition round

See also

 
 21 (disambiguation)
 2/11 (disambiguation)
 211th (disambiguation)